The 1985 Chatham Cup was the 58th annual nationwide knockout football competition in New Zealand.

Early stages of the competition were run in three regions (northern, central, and southern), with the National League teams receiving a bye into the Fourth Round (last 32) of the competition. In all, 141 teams took part in the competition. Note: Different sources give different numberings for the rounds of the competition: some start round one with the beginning of the regional qualifications; others start numbering from the first national knock-out stage. The former numbering scheme is used in this article.

The 1985 final
In the final Napier City Rovers beat North Shore United. Underdogs Napier had recently finished bottom of the New Zealand National Soccer League and faced a team containing international players Allan Boath and Keith Hobbs. Shore's keeper Allan Gilgrist was also soon to make his international debut. Expectation was that City Rovers would be heavily outclassed. 

Napier defied the odds by dominating the match, going into the lead after just two minutes via a Harry Clarke goal.  Paul Halford added a second before half time. Shore scored early in the second half through Barry Weymouth, but Greg Brown sealed the match for Napier in the dying minutes of the match. Napier were relegated the following week after losing to Manawatu United in the Promotion-Relegation play-offs in Palmerston North a week later. Thus Napier became the second team (after Western Suburbs FC in 1971) to be relegated and win the Chatham Cup in the same season.

Jack Batty Memorial Cup
The Jack Batty Memorial Cup, presented to the player of the final, was presented for the first time in 1985. The trophy honours Jack Batty, who was both a member of the crew of HMS Chatham and also a three-time medallist in the early days of the tournament with Harbour Board, Tramways, and Tramurewa. The cup was donated by his son, John Batty, who was himself a medallist with Blockhouse Bay in 1970.

The winner of the Jack Batty Memorial Cup for 1985 was Greg Brown of Napier City Rovers.

Results

Third round

* Won on penalties by New Brighton (3-2), Mosgiel (4-3), and Karori Swifts (4-3)

Fourth round

Fifth round

* Won on penalties by Christchurch United (3-2)

Quarter-finals

Semi-finals

Final

References

Rec.Sport.Soccer Statistics Foundation New Zealand 1985 page
UltimateNZSoccer website 1985 Chatham Cup page

Chatham Cup
Chatham Cup
Chatham Cup
Chat